Jyothika Saravanan (born 18 October 1978) is an Indian actress, model and film producer who predominantly appears in Tamil films. She has also acted in some Telugu, Malayalam, Kannada and Hindi films. She won one National Award, four Filmfare Awards, three Tamil Nadu State Film Awards, and four Dinakaran Awards. She is also a recipient of the Kalaimamani Award. She is regarded as one of the most prolific actresses in Tamil cinema. She has been ranked among the best actresses of South India by The Times of India and was referred as one of the Superstar women in Indian Cinema by The Hindu.

She debuted in Bollywood in the Hindi film Doli Saja Ke Rakhna (1997), directed by Priyadarshan. She starred in her first Tamil film Vaali (1999) and her first Telugu film Tagore (2003), opposite Chiranjeevi. She received her first Filmfare Award for Vaali (1999) as Filmfare Award for Best Female Debut – South. She was awarded the Filmfare Best Tamil Actress Award for Kushi (2000). A string of successful films followed and gained prominence for her performances in Kushi (2000), Dumm Dumm Dumm (2001), Poovellam Un Vasam  (2001), Kaakha Kaakha (2004), Perazhagan (2004), Chandramukhi (2005) and Mozhi, (2007), for the latter three she won Tamil Nadu State Film Award for Best Actress.For the movie, Mozhi, she was in the final three for National Film Award for Best Actress for her outstanding performance, however she lost the award to Umashree for the Kannada film Gulabi Talkies.
She has the record of holding maximum number of nominations with 16 for Best Tamil Actress at South Filmfare Awards. 

Jyothika left the industry at the peak of her career marrying Tamil actor Suriya on 11 September 2006, after being engaged in a relationship for several years, and with whom she was paired in seven films. She made a comeback in the film 36 Vayadhinile (2015) where her performance was given strong reviews and she received Filmfare Critics Award for Best Actress – South for the movie. After the success of 36 Vayadhinile, she appeared in a series of women centric movies like Magalir Mattum (2017), Naachiyaar (2018), Kaatrin Mozhi (2018), Raatchasi (2019) , and Ponmagal Vandhal (2020)  and also played a lead female role in Mani Ratnam's multi-starrer Chekka Chivantha Vaanam (2018).

Early life 
Jyothika was born on 18 October 1978 to a Punjabi father and a Maharashtrian Muslim mother. Her father is Chander Sadanah, a film producer and her mother is Seema Sadanah. Actress Nagma is her half-sister.

She completed her schooling in Learner's Academy, Mumbai. She later majored in Psychology at the Mithibai College in Mumbai. She also has a sister Roshini (born Radhika) and a brother Suraj, who is working as an assistant director for Priyadarshan.

Personal life 

Jyothika married actor Suriya on 11 September 2006, with whom she was paired in seven films; Poovellam Kettuppar, Uyirile Kalanthathu, Kaakha Kaakha, Perazhagan, Maayavi, June R and Sillunu Oru Kaadhal. The couple has two children, daughter Diya (born 10 August 2007) and son Dev (born 7 June 2010).

Career

Debut and early career (1998–2002)
She made her acting debut in the Hindi film Doli Saja Ke Rakhna, directed by Priyadarshan, but it did not do well commercially. For her fresh debut she was nominated for Best Female Debut at 44th Filmfare Awards, which was lost to Preity Zinta for
Dil Se.. and Soldier.

Her first role in Tamil was in Vaali (1999), for which she won Filmfare Award for Best Female Debut – South. and Dinakaran Award for the Best Female Debut. Later that year, she starred in Poovellam Kettuppar, in which she played the love interest of the protagonist, portrayed by her future husband Suriya. The success of the film Kushi became a turning point in her career. A string of successful films followed between 2000 and 2002, among them Mugavaree, Dumm Dumm Dumm and Snegithiye.  She also acted with Kamal Haasan during this period, in the comedy film Thenali. She was awarded the Filmfare Best Tamil Actress Award for her role in Kushi. Her role in Rhythm though small, has been widely appreciated. After the success of Kushi, she was signed to play the female lead in Friends, opposite Vijay, but she was replaced by Devayani. She collaborated with Mani Ratnam for the first time by appearing in his production house Madras Talkies' romantic comedy Dumm Dumm Dumm, alongside Madhavan. The film won positive acclaim and became a success not only in Tamil Nadu, but also in Andhra with its dubbed version. She also made an appearance in the Kannada film industry opposite Upendra in Nagarahavu. She had a dual role in this film. Later, she appeared in the Tamil thriller film Snegithiye, directed by Priyadarshan, made in Tamil and Malayalam.

Success and leading actress in Tamil cinema (2003-2009) 
In 2003, she starred in Dhool with Vikram, Kaakha Kaakha with Suriya, Thirumalai with Vijay, all of which did well at the box office, Kaakha Kaakha, in particular, being one of the biggest hits of her career. She was listed amongst the Best Actress nominees in Filmfare Awards South for her roles in Dhool and Kaakha Kaakha. She got International Tamil Film Awards Special Jury For Best Actress. Dhool, Kaakha Kaakha and Thirumalai were amongst the top 10 films of the year and The Hindu wrote that she was "virtually the undisputed queen of Kollywood". Actor Vikram referred to her as Lady Kamal Haasan due to her dedication in acting. In 2004, she acted in a double role in the critically acclaimed Perazhagan, opposite Suriya. She won Tamil Nadu State Best Actress Award for the film. In 2004, she acted in Manmadhan, opposite Silambarasan. She also performed the lead female role in the Telugu film Tagore, opposite Chiranjeevi, which was screened at the International Indian Film Academy Awards, and was a commercial success.

Her most successful film in Tamil was Chandramukhi (2005), in which she played the title role. She acted along with Rajinikanth for the first time. She won accolades for her performance in Chandramukhi including a Tamil Nadu State Film Awards and Filmfare Awards Nomination. She was also offered a chance to act with Mohanlal in Udayon, directed by Bhadran, but she could not do it due to busy schedules in Tamil. Her first release in 2006 was Saravana, opposite Silambarasan after Manmadhan. Her role in June R was noticed before the release of the film. She has underplayed her emotions beautifully. Her films in 2006 include Vettaiyaadu Vilaiyaadu, a crime thriller film written and directed by Gautham Vasudev Menon and Sillunu Oru Kaadhal, opposite Suriya.

Her last films were Gautham Vasudev Menon's Pachaikili Muthucharam and the critically acclaimed Mozhi, both in 2007. Her roles in these two films, as a negative character in the former (which she played for the first time) and as a deaf and mute in the latter earned her widespread appreciation. Among these, Mozhi won her acclaim. Her performance took her very close to winning the National Film Award for Best Actress. However, she lost the award by a narrow margin at the end. In Pachaikili Muthucharam she had a crucial role and pulled off a memorable performance. Jyothika later made a comeback through television adverts. In 2008, she appeared in a short film Herova? Zerova?. The film was written and produced by her father-in-law Sivakumar and also starred Vijay, R. Madhavan and Suriya. Her Malayalam films Raakilipattu and Seetha Kalyanam were released in 2007 and 2009 respectively after languishing in development hell for years.

Film comeback and further work (2015–2017) 
Jyothika made her comeback to Tamil Cinema with 36 Vayadhinile, a remake of the hit Malayalam film How Old Are You?. Jyothika received critical acclaim for her performance in the film as a middle-aged housewife who sets out to stand on her own. She was awarded the Filmfare Critics Award for Best Actress at the 63rd Filmfare Awards South. She also received Behindwoods Gold Medals For best Actress and Best Movie Award along with Suriya and also got many nominations for best actress. The film went on to become a commercial success at the box office. In the audio release of 36 Vayadhinile, and also at the successful release of the film Jyothika she credited Suriya, her husband, and some of her close friends as the major motivation for her comeback.

Later in February 2016, director Bramma approached Jyothika to play the leading role in a "female-centric" script he had written and impressed by the offer, her husband Suriya agreed to finance the film. Jyothika subsequently participated in a series of workshops to get ready for her role in the film for twenty days. The movie is titled Magalir Mattum, written and directed by Bramma, in his second venture after Kuttram Kadithal (2015). It also features Saranya, Urvashi, Bhanupriya, Nassar and J. Livingston playing pivotal roles. Produced by Suriya, the venture began production in July 2016. She was also signed by Sri Thenandal Films for another project titled Mersal together in September 2016, opposite Vijay, directed by Atlee. A few days after the shoot began, Jyothika opted out of the project and the makers signed Nithya Menen to replace her. No official announcement is made so far about the replacement.

In late February 2017, Suriya confirmed Jyothika's new project, Naachiyaar by sharing the first look posters of the film. She received several accolades for her performance in Naachiyar as Rough and Riveting Cop. Deccan chronicle addressed her as "Lady Singham". As per behindwoods Jyothika is fantastic, as she masterfully plays the role of a menacing, short-tempered and a bold cop, with a gracious heart. Following the immense success of the film and Jyothika's big fan following in the Telugu speaking states, the film Naachiyar has been dubbed into Telugu by the title Jhansi. Jyothika agreed to portray a leading female role in Mani Ratnam's project titled Chekka Chivantha Vaanam in early September 2017, and confirmed her participation to the media while promoting Magalir Mattum (2017). She had earlier appeared in Mani Ratnam's production venture Dumm Dumm Dumm (2001), but stated her excitement at being selected in a film to be directed by him.

Further success and recent work (2018–present) 
In 2018, she appeared as the lead role of Chitra, a housewife to Arvind Swami's character in Mani Ratnam's film Chekka Chivantha Vaanam. The first look was released on 21 August. The film has a worldwide release on 27 September 2018. She was next seen as a housewife struggling to find her own identity in Kaatrin Mozhi, the Tamil remake of Vidya Balan's Tumhari Sulu. The project, which officially went on the floors on 4 June, was directed by Radha Mohan and marked his reunion with Jyothika after the critically acclaimed Mozhi.

After the success of Kaatrin Mozhi, she was again cast as one of the female lead roles in Mani Ratnam's period action drama film, Ponniyin Selvan: I.She was also considered for the lead female role in Vetrimaaran's Asuran opposite Dhanush. She opted out from both films due to her prior project commitments.  Jyothika was seen in three films that year, Raatchasi, produced by Dream Warrior Pictures in which she plays a school teacher; Jackpot, in which she appears as a cop co-starring Revathi under 2D Entertainment and Thambi, a Jeethu Joseph film along with Karthi. She won several accolades for her performance in Raatchasi including Behindwoods Gold Medal Award for Best Actor Lead Role (Female), and the Edison Award for Best Actress.

After the success of three films, she starred in a legal drama film written and directed by J. J. Fredrick in his directorial debut,
Ponmagal Vandhal.Being Amazon's first Indian digital film and the maiden Tamil film to be released on a streaming platform following pandemic restrictions, the film was premiered digitally on 29 May 2020 and received mixed reviews from critics, praising Jyothika's performance, story and the social message conveyed in the film, but criticised the lack of depth in the narration, slow-paced and clichéd screenplay. However, it became one of the most watched films in digital streaming services of the year. Her 50th film, Udanpirappe was released directly on Amazon Prime Video on 14 October 2021 as a part of 2D Entertainment's four-film deal with the streaming service.She was Nominated for Best actress Category for her performances in both films, Ponmagal Vandhal and Udanpirappe as Venba / Angel / Sakthijothi (imagination) and  Maathangi Sargunam respectively at 67th Filmfare Awards South.

Other ventures

2D Entertainment 

Jyothika owns a film production and distribution company named 2D Entertainment, established by her husband and actor Suriya. Rajsekar Pandian is also a part of 2D. The company was named by the starting letter of Suriya children Diya and Dev. The company was established in 2013.

The production house won Best Cinematography at 64th National Film Awards for DOP Tirru for 24 (2016) 
and Best Production Design at 64th National Film Awards for Subrata Chakraborthy, Shreyas Khedekar, Amit Ray for 24 (2016) 

At 68th National Film Awards the film Soorarai Pottru won 5 Categories.Best Actor for Suriya, National Film Award for Best Actress
 for Aparna Balamurali, Best Feature Film for Suriya, Sudha Kongara, Jyothika, Best Music Direction (Background Score)   for GV Prakash Kumar
and Best Screenplay for Sudha Kongara

Telugu career 
Jyothika's first Telugu entry as the lead female role was in the Telugu film Tagore, opposite Chiranjeevi, in which she played his wife. The film was screened at the International Indian Film Academy Awards, and was a commercial success. She acted along with Nagarjuna in Mass, directed by debutant Raghava Lawrence, for which she was nominated for her first Filmfare Award for Best Actress – Telugu Nomination at Filmfare Awards. The film was dubbed into Tamil with the title Veeran, which also became a blockbuster and Hindi as Meri Jung–One Man Army.

Her last film in Telugu was Shock, opposite to Ravi Teja. It was produced by Ram Gopal Varma.She was nominated for Filmfare Award for Best Actress – Telugu for her performance. She was considered to act in the Telugu film Stalin, opposite Chiranjeevi. She was selected as the lead actress opposite Nagarjuna in Sri Ramadasu and Venkatesh in Lakshmi, but refused the offers due to her marriage preparations. She was asked to act along with Venkatesh again in Aadavari Matalaku Arthale Verule. Jyothika opted out after signing the contract due to her wedding arrangements and it later came to the hands of Trisha.

Her film Mozhi was released in Telugu under the title Maataranai Mounamidi, which won critical accolades for her performance and was a commercial success.

After an impressive comeback, she was approached by director Venu Sriram and producer Dil Raju for a strong character in the film Middle Class Abbayi starring Nani, Sai Pallavi and Bhumika Chawla. Chawla replaced her later. Boyapati Srinu was considered Jyothika in Jai Simha opposite to Nandamuri Balakrishna, but later K. S. Ravikumar replaced Boyapati and Jyothika's role went to Nayanthara. Her latest film Thambi along with Karthi was dubbed into Telugu as Donga.

Malayalam career
Gargi, starring Sai Pallavi was 
distributed by Jyothika and Suriya,
She will next act in a Malayalam film opposite to Mammootty, under The Great Indian Kitchen film director Jeo Baby. This will be her third Malayalam Movie after Rakklippattu and Seetha Kalyanam. She was nominated for best actress trophy at Filmfare Awards, for the latter but was lost to Swetha Menon for Paleri Manikyam.

Brand endorsements 
Jyothika has endorsed several brands such as Idhayam oil and Paragon footwear in the early 2000s. She was also the brand ambassador for RmKV silk sarees and Wardrobe Hub in Chennai. Later, she appeared in adverts for Aircel and Nescafé along with her husband Suriya. She has also endorsed Comfort, Saravana Stores and [[Wipro Enterprises
Wipro Consumer Care & Lighting|Santoor Soap]].

Jyotika has been announced as the Zee Tamil channel's first brand ambassador, who features in the channel's extensive multi-media campaign as its voice. The unveil and launch happened on the stage of Sa Re Ga Ma Pa Seniors with the entire family of stars from Zee Tamil in a ceremony celebrating the channels new look and feel and brand proposition.

Jyothika, along with actor Vivek, had been appointed as ambassadors for plastic free Tamil Nadu campaign by the State government under the leadership of former Chief Minister Edappadi K. Palaniswami.

Philanthropy 
Jyothika along with her husband Suriya's Agaram Foundation donated  to the Thanjavur government hospital in August 2020. Apart from the financial support she also donated medical equipment and beds. This comes after she was criticised for her comments on the poor maintenance of the hospital before.

Filmography

Awards and nominations

References

External links 

 

Indian film actresses
Actresses in Tamil cinema
1977 births
Living people
Actresses from Mumbai
Actresses in Hindi cinema
Actresses in Malayalam cinema
Tamil Nadu State Film Awards winners
Filmfare Awards South winners
Actresses in Kannada cinema
Recipients of the Kalaimamani Award
Actresses in Telugu cinema
20th-century Indian actresses
21st-century Indian actresses
Punjabi people